Keech is a surname. Notable people with the surname include:

 Hazel Keech (born 1987), Indian film actress and model
 Kelvin Keech (1895–1977), American actor, producer, and radio announcer
 Margaret Keech (born 1954), Australian Labour Party politician
 Matthew Keech (born 1970), English cricketer
 Ray Keech (1900–1929), board track and brick track racer in the 1920s
 Richmond Bowling Keech (1896–1986), United States federal judge
 William Keech (born 1872), English footballer who played as a defender

See also
 Keech Cottage, hospice in Luton, England
 Keech v Sandford in English case law
 The Voyage of the Sable Keech, 2006 science fiction novel by Neal Asher
 Cheech (disambiguation)
 Kheechee
 Kieche